Rolf Caroli (23 December 1933 – 10 June 2007) was an East German amateur light-middleweight boxer who won bronze medals at the European championships in 1955, 1957 and 1959. He competed in the 1960 Summer Olympics, but lost in the first bout. His brother was East German boxing champion Goerg Caroli.

1960 Olympic results
Below is the record of Rolf Caroli, a light middleweight boxer who competed for the United German Team at the 1960 Rome Olympics:

 Round of 32: lost to Pedro Votta (Uruguay) by decision, 2-3

References

1933 births
2007 deaths
Sportspeople from Halle (Saale)
People from the Province of Saxony
German male boxers
Sportspeople from Saxony-Anhalt
Olympic boxers of the United Team of Germany
Boxers at the 1960 Summer Olympics
Light-middleweight boxers